The 1920 Dartford by-election was held on 27 March 1920.  The by-election was held due to the death of the incumbent Coalition Liberal MP, James Rowlands.  It was won by the Labour candidate John Edmund Mills.

References

1920 in England
Borough of Dartford
1920 elections in the United Kingdom
By-elections to the Parliament of the United Kingdom in Kent constituencies
1920s in Kent